"Las Trece Rosas" (the Thirteen Roses) is the name given in Spain to a group of thirteen young women who were executed by a Francoist firing squad just after the conclusion of the Spanish Civil War. Their execution was part of a massive execution campaign known as the "saca de agosto", which included 43 young men (among them a fourteen-year-old).

The thirteen victims were: 
Carmen Barrero Aguado (age 24), 
Martina Barroso García (age 22), 
Blanca Brissac Vázquez (age 29), 
Pilar Bueno Ibáñez (age 27), 
Julia Conesa Conesa (age 19), 
Adelina García Casillas (age 19), 
Elena Gil Olaya (age 20), 
Virtudes González García (age 18), 
Ana López Gallego (age 21), 
Joaquina López Laffite (age 23), 
Dionisia Manzanero Salas (age 20), 
Victoria Muñoz García (age 19), 
Luisa Rodríguez de la Fuente (age 18). Seven of the women were under age - in Francoist Spain the age of majority was 21.

Following the capitulation of Madrid to Franco's troops and the end of the Civil War, the Madrid Provincial Committee of the Unified Socialist Youth (JSU) (an organisation resulting from the merger of the Socialist Youth and the Communist Youth even though most pro-Spanish Socialist Workers' Party (PSOE) members had abandoned the organisation) tried to reorganise under the leadership of 21-year-old José Peña Brea. He was betrayed, arrested, and tortured; under torture he revealed the names of his collaborators, which led to a wave of arrests of JSU members in Madrid. The Thirteen Roses were among the many JSU members captured and imprisoned by the police. During their detention in the Ventas prison they were repeatedly tortured and humiliated, and conditions in the prison were considered inhumane and overcrowded. They were ultimately executed by firing squad against the wall of the East Cemetery (now la Almudena) on 5 August 1939. Many of their comrades at the prison recall that while they were being driven away by lorry to their deaths, they sang the "Youthful Guardsmen" (JSU's anthem) so as to be heard by their comrades who remained in jail. The victims were accused of aiding a military rebellion and of assassinating a high-ranking political police officer, his 16-year-old daughter, and driver; however, they were already in prison when the assassination occurred.   

In 2005, a foundation (Fundación Trece Rosas) was created in Spain to keep their memory alive.

References

 Jesús Ferrero, Las Trece Rosas, Madrid, Siruela, 2003
 Carlos Fonseca, Trece Rosas Rojas, Madrid, Temas De Hoy, 2004

Notes

External links
 Foundation Trece Rosas (archived)
 Tribute to Las Trece Rosas (archived)
 La corta vida de trece rosas
  with part of the original verdict.

Spanish women of the Spanish Civil War (Republican faction)
Spanish socialists
Spanish communists
Executed activists
People executed by Francoist Spain
Executed Spanish women
People executed by Spain by firing squad